Sans Filtre is a Japanese band, formed in the millennium featuring three former members of The Spiders, Masaaki Sakai, Takayuki Inoue, and Hiroshi "Monsieur" Kamayatsu. The Spiders, formed in 1962, were one of the biggest bands of the Group Sounds era. Sans Filtre are no longer together after breaking up in the late 2000s

Japanese rock music groups